Claude St. Sauveur (born January 2, 1952) is a Canadian former professional ice hockey player who played 285 games in the World Hockey Association and 79 games in the National Hockey League between 1972 and 1979.

Early life 
St. Sauveur was born in Saint-Hyacinthe, Quebec. As a youth, he played in the 1964 Quebec International Pee-Wee Hockey Tournament with a minor ice hockey team from Saint-Hyacinthe.

Career 
During his career, St. Sauveur played for the Indianapolis Racers, Cincinnati Stingers, Edmonton Oilers, Philadelphia Blazers, Vancouver Blazers, Calgary Cowboys, and Atlanta Flames.

Career statistics

Regular season and playoffs

References

External links

1952 births
Living people
Atlanta Flames players
Calgary Cowboys players
California Golden Seals draft picks
Canadian ice hockey centres
Canadian ice hockey coaches
Cincinnati Stingers players
Edmonton Oilers (WHA) players
French Quebecers
Granby Bisons coaches
Ice hockey people from Quebec
Indianapolis Racers players
Japan Ice Hockey League players
Sherbrooke Castors players
Sportspeople from Saint-Hyacinthe
Philadelphia Blazers players
Roanoke Valley Rebels (EHL) players
Tidewater Sharks players
Vancouver Blazers players